The Sierra Estrella is a mountain range located southwest of Phoenix, Arizona.  Much of the range falls within the Gila River Indian Reservation, but  of BLM land is protected as the Sierra Estrella Wilderness.

Description

On the highest peaks, temperatures are usually 8–12 degrees (Fahrenheit) cooler than in the valley. Snow can be seen at least once or twice a year on the highest points of the mountain range (typically above 4,000 ft). Sometimes, the snow level can drop near , but depends if the precipitation reaches the mountain range. A good example is during the month of March 2006, when a heavy storm system reached the state and lowered snow levels near . Once the skies cleared next morning, snow covered the Estrella's mountain tops.

Estrella Mountain Regional park occupies  in the northern portion of the range. The park offers multi-use trails including a competitive loop for running and mountain biking. Equestrian use is permitted. The park has parking and a riding arena.

History 
The Sierra Estrellas were inhabited by the Akimel O'odham people and also some Yavapai bands at the north end of the range at the time of Spanish colonization, and today the mountains tower over several of the Akimel O'odham and Maricopa villages of the Gila River Indian Community. There are petroglyphs throughout the Southern portion of the range. In the colonial era, they were part of the land claimed as New Spain. Occasionally Spanish explorers or priests, most notably Father Kino, would venture near the range to document the area and contact the Akimel O'odham. On his return from the Colorado River in March 1699, Kino climbed a pass through the Sierra Estrellas and saw the Río Salado and Río Verde that he drew on his maps.

In 1810, Mexico declared independence from Spain, and the Sierra Estrellas went on to become part of Mexico. In 1827, a French fur trapping expedition led by Michel Robidoux was attacked by Indians and survivors escaped into the Sierra Estrella mountains.  In 1853, the United States acquired the Estrellas from Mexico as part of the Gadsden purchase. It soon became part of a trade route for settlers in California known as the Butterfield Overland stage. People and equipment could be moved across the area much quicker. The route was massively successful in its time, moving millions of dollars in supplies. However, it was short-lived. Steam locomotives soon replaced stage coaches across the United States, and the Butterfield Stage Route was no longer utilized.

In 1857, the Battle of Pima Butte was fought in the area of the mountains. The allied Yuma, Mohave, Yavapai and Apache peoples attacked the Maricopa village of Sacate. The Maricopa and their allies, the Akimel O'odham, defeated the attackers, leaving approximately 200 of them dead or wounded. It is notable for being the last major battle fought solely between indigenous Americans in North America.

Access

Four-wheel-drive vehicles are required to approach the wilderness boundary. Only the western boundary of the wilderness is accessible to the public; elsewhere the wilderness is bounded by the Gila River Indian Reservation.

Peaks 

The major peaks of the Sierra Estrella are (NW to SE):
 Hayes Peak, named in honor of Ira Hayes, US Marine hero of the Pima Nation
 Montezuma Sleeping
 Butterfly Mountain, 
 Quartz Peak,  (usually obscured by Butterfly Mountain when viewed from the east)
 Montezuma Peak, 
 Montezuma Head

The names of the peaks can vary by map. For example, Google Maps lists Hayes Peak as Sierra Estrella High Point and does not name any other peak.

See also

List of mountain ranges of Arizona
List of Arizona Wilderness Areas

References

External links 

 Estrella Mountain Regional Park Trails at HikeArizona.COM

Wilderness areas of Arizona
Mountain ranges of the Sonoran Desert
Mountain ranges of Maricopa County, Arizona
Mountain ranges of Arizona
Bureau of Land Management areas in Arizona
Protected areas of Maricopa County, Arizona